William James Green (1834 – 11 January 1876) was an English cricketer who played in three first-class cricket matches for Kent County Cricket Club between 1856 and 1861. He was born at Gravesend in Kent in 1834.

Green made his debut for Kent against Sussex in 1856. He made two further first-class appearances for the county, in 1859 against Middlesex and in 1861 against Cambridgeshire. He died in Gravesend in 1876.

References

External links

1834 births
1876 deaths
Sportspeople from Gravesend, Kent
English cricketers
Kent cricketers